Yijing (Chinese: 奕經; Wade–Giles: I-ching; 1793–1853) was a Manchu prince of the Qing Dynasty. He was a nephew of the Daoguang Emperor. In 1826, he served at Kashgar as a junior officer in the campaign against Jahangir Khoja. During the First Opium War, after the British captured Zhenhai and Ningpo, the emperor ordered Yijing to go to Zhejiang on 18 October 1841 and take command of a counter-offensive. In the Battle of Ningpo on 10 March 1842, Yijing's troops attempted to retake the city, but the British successfully repelled the attack.

References 

 

1793 births
1853 deaths
Qing dynasty generals
Assistant Grand Secretaries
People of the First Opium War
Prince Cheng
Prince Xun (循)